John O'Connor (1 August 1894 – 10 October 1977) was an Irish athlete. He competed in the men's triple jump at the 1924 Summer Olympics.

References

External links
 

1894 births
1977 deaths
Athletes (track and field) at the 1924 Summer Olympics
Irish male triple jumpers
Olympic athletes of Ireland